BRSB may refer to:

 Battlefield Reasoning System Brianna
 Braunwald-Standseilbahn, a funicular railway in the Swiss canton of Glarus